Abd Hanafie Tokyo bin Abd Hasim (born 25 March 1999) is a Malaysian professional footballer who plays as a defender for Malaysia Super League club Sabah.

References

External links

Living people
Malaysian footballers
Sabah F.C. (Malaysia) players
Association football defenders
1999 births